The Nisqually Valley News is a weekly newspaper based in Yelm in Thurston County, Washington. The publication was founded in 1922. The newspaper is published weekly on Fridays with a circulation of 4,400 people. The Nisqually Valley News was originally independent and published by O.K. Press Company and is currently owned by Lafromboise Communications, Inc.

The editor in 1922 was Sam Sparks. The current editor is Megan Hansen.

Awards 
 Washington Newspaper Publishers Association awarded the newspaper in the following years:
2015
2016
2017
2018
2019 
2020

References

External links 
 Nisqually Valley News

Newspapers published in Washington (state)
Thurston County, Washington